Garcinia aristata is a species of flowering plant in the family Clusiaceae. It is native to Cuba, and possibly Hispaniola and Puerto Rico. It is threatened by habitat loss.

References

aristata
Flora of Cuba
Flora of Haiti
Flora of the Dominican Republic
Flora of Puerto Rico
Taxonomy articles created by Polbot